Caffè Mediterraneum, often referred to as Caffè Med or simply the Med, was a café located on Telegraph Avenue in Berkeley, California, US, near the University of California, Berkeley. The Med was a landmark of Telegraph Avenue history, "listed for years in European guidebooks as 'the gathering place for 1960s radicals who created People's Park" and as of 2009 described in Fodor's guidebook as "a relic of 1960s-era café culture". It was located at 2475 Telegraph Avenue, between Dwight Way and Haste Street.

History

Established as a coffeehouse inside a bookstore in 1956 under the name Il Piccolo by Maxine Chitarin before being renamed in 1957, the Med was "one of the oldest coffeehouses in the Bay Area" and "the oldest coffeehouse in the East Bay".

The café's website maintains that "Lino Meiorin, one of the owners, was the first Italian-trained barista in the Bay Area. Customers were not used to the strong flavor of a traditional Italian cappuccino and would ask Lino for more milk. Speaking in Italian, he would tell the barista to put more latte (milk) in their cup. Finally he thought of putting a larger drink on the menu with the same amount of espresso but more steamed milk, and calling it a caffè latte."

During the 1960s, the Med featured a diverse crowd of patrons, and it became a meeting place for Beat Generation artists, intellectuals, Black Power advocates, and activists who were taking part in the Free Speech Movement and post-FSM activism. During this era, the Med also played a role in two important pieces of art. Allen Ginsberg was a regular at the Med and probably wrote Howl on the premises of the Med. Though the owner at the time initially refused access to the film crews, a scene in 1967's The Graduate starring Dustin Hoffman was also filmed at a table in the Med, with Telegraph Avenue visible outside the window.

Of Telegraph Avenue, "many city officials and merchants say the avenue has lost its vibrancy" since the 1960s, but "until the 1990s, the Med thrived as a center for conversation and caffeine." Changes in ownership took a toll though, and at that point, employees say the Med "took a turn for the worse" as it was "bordering on a homeless shelter". However, with another change in ownership 2006, the Med again became "a destination for activists seeking social change". 

On November 30th, 2016, the Med closed for renovations. , the location of the Caffe Mediterraneum has since been converted to Sizzling Lunch, a chain Japanese restaurant.

See also
Cody's Books
Southside, Berkeley, California

Notes

External links
Caffè Mediterraneum official website

Culture of Berkeley, California
Coffeehouses and cafés in the United States
History of Berkeley, California
Italian-American culture in California
Tourist attractions in Berkeley, California
Restaurants established in 1956
1956 establishments in California
Restaurants in Berkeley, California